Government General Degree College, Mejia, established in 2015,. is the government degree college in Mejia, Bankura district. It offers undergraduate courses in science, arts and commerce. It is affiliated to Bankura University.

Departments

Science

Physics
Mathematics
Geology

Arts and Commerce

Bengali
English
History
Philosophy
Economics
Accountancy

See also

References

External links 

Universities and colleges in Bankura district
Colleges affiliated to Bankura University
Educational institutions established in 2015
2015 establishments in West Bengal